Amblyptilia japonica is a moth of the family Pterophoridae. It is known from Japan (Honshu) and Korea.

The length of the forewings is 10–11.5 mm.

References

External links

Taxonomic And Biological Studies Of Pterophoridae Of Japan (Lepidoptera)
Japanese Moths

Moths described in 1963
Amblyptilia
Moths of Japan